Moldova competed at the World Games 2017  in Wroclaw, Poland, from 20 July 2017 to 30 July 2017.

Competitors

Kickboxing

Moldova has qualified at the 2017 World Games:

Men's 86kg – 1 quota (Adrian Gologan)
Men's 91kg – 1 quota (Pavel Voronin)

Dancesport

Moldova has qualified at the 2017 World Games:

 Latin  – 1 quota (Gabriele Goffredo & Anna Matus)
 Standard – 1 quota (Dima Kusnir & Valeria Gumeniuc)

References 

Nations at the 2017 World Games
2017 in Moldovan sport
2017